The Defense Advisory Committee on Women in the Services (DACOWITS) is one of the oldest Department of Defense (DoD) federal advisory committees and was established in 1951 by then-Secretary of Defense (SecDef) George C. Marshall. The committee is composed of civilian women and men appointed by the SecDef to provide advice and recommendations on matters and policies relating to the recruitment, retention, employment, integration, well-being, and treatment of women in the U.S. Armed Forces. As a discretionary DoD federal advisory committee, it is authorized under the provisions of the Federal Advisory Committee Act (FACA) of 1972 (5 U.S.C., Appendix) and 41 C.F.R. § 102-3.50(d). Committee members review issues and conduct information-gathering activities through installation visits, meetings, reports, and surveys. The committee typically meets quarterly and provides recommendations to the SecDef for consideration via an annual report.

Formation
The Women's Armed Services Integration Act of 1948 established specific roles for women in the peacetime Armed Forces of the United States. Previously, women had only been allowed to serve as nurses in peacetime with a wider variety of roles only open to them in time of war. However, with the start of the Korean War in June 1950, the DoD began to investigate ways to increase recruitment and retention of women in all services. Internal inquiries from defense agencies, such as the National Security Resources Board, and external pressure from politicians, such as Senator Margaret Chase Smith, added to the sense of urgency in defining a more comprehensive position for women in the military.

At the suggestion of Assistant Secretary of Defense for Manpower Anna Rosenberg, Marshall formed the Defense Advisory Committee on Women in the Services in August 1951. Its first chair was Mary Pillsbury Lord, a civic activist who had been chair of the National Civilian Advisory Committee of the Women's Army Corps (WAC). Some of its original members included Oveta Culp Hobby, the first WAC director; Mildred McAfee Horton, former director of the Women Accepted for Volunteer Emergency Service (WAVES); Ruth Streeter, former director of the Women Marines; actress Helen Hayes; Sarah G. Blanding, Vassar College president; engineer Lillian Gilbreth; and publisher Beatrice Gould. Meeting for three days at the Pentagon in 1951, they heard presentations about recruiting and the possible need for a women's draft based on the failure of recruiting during World War II to meet the military services' requirements for women. The committee helped to develop policies and standards for women in the military—using them, expanding their opportunities, recruiting them, and training them. The committee ensured that military women would have representation at the Department of Defense.

Current Operations 
Over the years, the DACOWITS charter has expanded, enabling the committee to submit numerous recommendations to the SecDef. The majority of proposals have been either fully or partially implemented. DACOWITS is instrumental to the DoD and has made significant contributions on topics including the opening of closed positions to women; improvements to the health of deployed servicewomen; increased marketing, accession, and recruitment of women; and increased parental leave authorizations.

Membership 
Committee members include leaders with diverse, inclusive, and varied backgrounds from academia, industry, private and public sectors, and other professions. Membership selection is on the basis of experience with the military or with women-related workforce issues. Members are appointed for a 4-year term of service (renewed annually), serve without compensation, and perform a variety of duties, which include: visiting military installations; conducting a review and evaluation of research on women; and developing a comprehensive annual report with recommendations for consideration by the Secretary of Defense. Of note, Committee members are appointed to serve as independent advisors, not as official representatives of any group or organization with which they may be affiliated.

Reports & Recommendations 
DACOWITS gathers information from multiple sources, to include briefings and written responses from DoD, Service-level military representatives, and subject matter experts. The committee collects qualitative data from focus groups and interactions with Service members representing the Air Force, Army, Marine Corps, Navy, and Coast Guard during installation visits. Additionally, the committee examines peer-reviewed literature. Based upon the data collected and analyzed, the committee will submit recommendations and continuing concerns to the SecDef.

Service Liaisons & Other Defense Points of Contact 
In accordance with Department of Defense Instruction (DoDI) 5105.04, “Department of Defense Federal Advisory Committee Management Program,” dated August 6, 2007, and Deputy Secretary of Defense memorandum, “Advisory Committee Management,” dated November 26, 2018, the Military Services will designate a Service Liaison to the DACOWITS. Service Liaisons attend each DACOWITS quarterly business meeting for the entire duration of the public meeting; respond to all DACOWITS requests for information; and ensure the information provided to DACOWITS receives appropriate security reviews prior to the release of any public disclosure of information. Other Defense points of contact are designated through the Under Secretary of Defense for Personnel and Readiness.

Committee Chairs

Recommendations
DACOWITS’ recommendations have addressed a variety of topics and subtopics throughout the years. The table below lists the most common topics of concern the committee has addressed.

References

Further reading 
D'Amico, Francine J., and Laurie L. Weinstein, eds. (1999). Gender Camouflage: Women and the U.S. Military. New York: NYU Press. . OCLC 39951636.

Judith Lawrence Bellafaire, "Public Service Role Models: The First Women of the Defense Advisory Committee on Women in the Services"

United States. Defense Advisory Committee on Women in the Services Records, 1951-1959. Schlesinger Library , Radcliffe Institute, Harvard University.

External links 

Defense Advisory Committee on Women in the Services
DACOWITS Annual Reports
DACOWITS Facebook and DACOWITS Instagram
Defense Equal Opportunity Management Institute
Office of Diversity Management and Equal Opportunity
Defense Human Resources Activity - Diversity Management Operations Center
Advisory Committee on Women Veterans
U.S. Department of Veterans Affairs Center for Women Veterans
DoD Women's Health
DoD Personnel statistics
Women in the Services Review (WISR) Studies
Fact Sheet: WISR Implementation

United States Department of Defense agencies
Women in the United States military